The Men's Columbia round open was one of the events held in Archery at the 1960 Summer Paralympics in Rome.

There were only three competitors, whose full names are not recorded. France's two representatives took gold and silver respectively, while the sole British competitor took bronze. Delapietra of France and Hepple of Great Britain obtained the same score (544), but the silver meddle was awarded to Delapietra.

References 

M